USS Pillsbury (DE-133) was an Edsall-class destroyer escort in service with the United States Navy from 1943 to 1947. She served again as a radar picket ship from 1955 to 1960 and was sold for scrapping in 1966.

History
She was named after Rear Admiral John E. Pillsbury, known as having been one of the world's foremost geographers and as an authority on the Gulf Stream. Actively identified with the National Geographic Society for many years, he was president of the society at the time of his death, 30 December 1919.

Pillsbury (DE–133) was laid down by the Consolidated Steel Corp., Orange, Texas, 18 July 1942; launched 10 January 1943; sponsored by Mrs. Elsie G. Richardson; and commissioned 7 June 1943, Lt. Comdr. W. Parker, USNR, in command.  Parker would later be succeeded by Francis L. Dale (later owner of the Cincinnati Reds, and a member of Richard M. Nixon's campaign staff.)

Battle of the Atlantic
After shakedown Pillsbury’s first duty was as flagship for Escort Division 4, escorting convoys into Casablanca and Gibraltar.

Sinking U-515 
On the night of 8 April 1944, planes from Guadalcanal attacked a surfaced German U-boat. The U-boat immediately submerged for deep evasive tactics. Pillsbury and  raced to the scene and Pillsbury made initial sound contact and attacked with hedgehogs. The depth charges forced the U-boat to the surface, but the German sailors were determined to fight to a finish with their torpedoes. Six officers, including the Captain, and fifty-seven of the crew were captured.
 
After repair at Norfolk, Virginia, the hunter-killers sailed from Norfolk in May with a special mission to "bring one back live".

Capturing U-505 

On 4 June 1944, about 100 miles off the Cape Verde islands, sound contact was made on a U-boat trying to penetrate the destroyer screen for a shot at the Guadalcanal. Two pilots sighted the submarine running under the surface, and splashed the sea with gunfire to point out the contact to Pillsbury, and  rushing to the attack. Their depth charges blasted a hole in the outer hull of the submarine and her captain, believing his boat was doomed, surfaced and ordered the crew to abandon ship, which they did while leaving her engines running.  Pillsbury lowered a boarding party, led by Lt. Albert David.  The party boarded the still-circling , climbed its conning tower and stormed down the hatches, fully expecting to meet stiff resistance. Finding the boat deserted, the boarders set about collecting two Enigma coding machines, code books, charts and papers, tearing out delayed-action demolition charges, closing valves, and plugging leaks.  For this demonstration of conspicuous gallantry and achievement, Pillsbury was awarded the Presidential Unit Citation.  Lt. David was awarded the Medal of Honor and two other members of the boarding party were awarded the Navy Cross.  The U-boat's captain, five officers, and fifty-three of her crew were rescued, taken prisoner, then held incommunicado to keep the boat's capture secret. U-505 was towed 2,500 miles to Bermuda and revealed some of the German Navy's most guarded secrets.   The U-505 is now permanently displayed at the Chicago Museum of Science and Industry.

Sinking of U-546 
On 24 April 1945 Pillsbury, as a member of Task Unit 22.7.1 operating in the North Atlantic, depth charged and sank .

Surrender of U-858 
After hostilities with Germany ended, Pillsbury and  escorted the first surrendered German U-boat, from mid-Atlantic to Cape May, New Jersey after placing a prize crew aboard.

Post-War decommissioning 
In 1947, Pillsbury was placed out of commission, in reserve, in the Florida Group, Atlantic Reserve Fleet.

Radar Picket Ship 
In June 1954, the vessel was moved to the Philadelphia Naval Shipyard, fitted out with the latest equipment, redesignated a radar picket ship, DER–133, in August 1954 and recommissioned 15 March 1955. After refresher training and shakedown Pillsbury sailed for Newport, Rhode Island, to assume her duties as a radar guardship acting as an element of the protective radar screens around the United States. During 1957-1960 Pillsbury made seven picket patrols on the Atlantic Barrier, five trips to Argentia, Newfoundland, a European visit to Portsmouth, England and Le Havre, France, one trip to Summerside, Prince Edward Island, and one trip, in 1958, to Gibraltar. She decommissioned 20 June 1960; was struck from the Naval Vessel Register 1 July 1965; and was sold for scrapping to Boston Metals Co., Baltimore, Maryland, in 1966.

Awards 
 
Pillsbury received five battle stars for World War II service in addition to the Presidential Unit Citation.

References

External links

 NavSource Online: Destroyer Escort Photo Archive - USS Pillsbury (DE-133)

Edsall-class destroyer escorts
Ships built in Orange, Texas
1943 ships
World War II frigates and destroyer escorts of the United States